Phobos is the name of two fictional comic book characters appearing in books published by Marvel Comics characters, based on the Greek mythological deity of the same name. The first appeared in Dr. Strange, Sorcerer Supreme #32 (August 1991) in a story written by Roy Thomas and Jean-Marc Lofficier.

The second and current Phobos first appeared in the 2006 Ares: God of War mini-series (written by Michael Avon Oeming; art by Travel Foreman). He is the son of Ares, step-brother to Hippolyta, and a member of the Secret Warriors.

Due to the nature of gods in the Marvel Universe, in addition to the retcon surrounding the current Phobos (see below) the relationship between the two has not been explicitly explained.

Original

Publication history
The original Phobos first appeared in the "A Gathering of Fear" storyline in Dr. Strange, Sorcerer Supreme #32 (August 1991) written by Roy Thomas and Jean-Marc Lofficier. He reappeared in "The Great Fear" storyline in DS:SS #39 (March 1992).

Fictional biography
Phobos and his brother Deimos are sons of Ares and Nox (posing as Venus) but were killed by Thor and Hercules in their first appearance. Later the Fear Lords release so much fear that Nox is able to bring her sons back, creating them from the Darkforce but they were eventually defeated again. Phobos meets his final fate when Amatsu-Mikaboshi assaults Olympus and kills him.

Alexander

Publication history
The current Phobos, Alexander, first appeared in the Ares limited series in 2006 written by Michael Avon Oeming. Here, he is manipulated by Amatsu-Mikaboshi into becoming a warrior until his father, Ares, saves him many years later, a young adult with god-like powers. This ending is ignored for future storyline purposes.

The character returns, retconned by Brian Michael Bendis and reduced to a ten-year-old boy with no specialized training in Mighty Avengers #1, then reappears in the Secret Invasion crossover, in Mighty Avengers and the Secret Invasion limited series. Once Dark Reign started, he began appearing regularly in Secret Warriors.

Fictional character biography
The current Phobos is a young boy named Alexander Aaron. In the 2006 Ares: God or War mini-series, Alexander is taken from his father, Ares, by Zeus, and then kidnapped by the Japanese god Amatsu-Mikaboshi. Mikaboshi, in an attempt to destroy the Marvel pantheons, trains and manipulates Alex for at least five Olympian years - which vary substantially from human years in that years can pass to the gods while simultaneously only a few days or months passing for humans - under the guise of a mother-figure who eventually turns him into a deadly swordsman. He is saved from the evil deity when the combination of Zeus and Ares's influences broke his brainwashing. Their salvation apparently eliminates his skills.

Brian Michael Bendis then ret-conned these events in Mighty Avengers. When Alex / Phobos is first approached by fellow Secret Warrior Daisy, he is once again a young boy, untrained, and aware that his father is the god Ares (Mighty Avengers #13). (The general story of Mikaboshi destroying the Marvel pantheons and Zeus' sacrifice remains canon however). It's at this point that Daisy reveals to Alex that he is Phobos. After this, he begins to gain fear like powers, having inherited the original's abilities. However, in Mighty Avengers #13 he scared off a couple of boys, and after that he lied to Daisy that he doesn't have any powers, but she doesn't believe him. After talk with her he says 'that explains so much' because he realises then that he's new Phobos, and was born mortal, but after drinking Mikaboshi's blood he became god and now he has fear powers and Daisy told him who he really is (new god of fear). In that issue Ares tells him that he's an Avenger right now and he cannot worry about his grades.

During the Secret Invasion storyline, Alex is recruited by Nick Fury for his team of Secret Warriors. Post-invasion, he remains a member of the team and has shown evidence of additional pre-cognitive powers. However, his father has noticed his absence upon receiving a truancy notice. In the aftermath of Utopia, Ares followed Alex and Daisy to one of Fury's base, where he discovers his son's affiliation with the former S.H.I.E.L.D. director. Fury tells Ares that his son has potential. Ares ultimately accepts his son's decision, meaning that he doesn't need to hide his allegiance anymore. Phobos later pilots a Fury Life Model Decoy to assist Black Widow and Songbird but they are captured by the Thunderbolts. As soon as Norman Osborn shoots the LMD in the head, Phobos reveals himself, inflicting Osborn with the fear that he will lose his mind soon enough. During Siege, Phobos tried to tag along with the other secret warriors to help the Asgardians, but Nick Fury wouldn't let him, because he knew his father would die and he didn't want him to witness it. When the fiasco was over, Thor confronted Phobos telling him that Ares was dead and he offered to take him to see his next of kin in Mount Olympus. However, he declined his offer. Thor offered that if he ever changed his mind, he would take him there. Although he had mixed feelings with his dad, he still felt sad that he died.

Phobos is now in Elysium after having been stabbed and killed by Gorgon wielding the sword Godkiller. His last appearance had his father proud of his actions as they were reunited in the afterlife.

Powers and abilities
Both versions of Phobos control the power of fear, a power that has been seen to cause victims to run for their lives as well as attack their partners. Certain characters have proven immune to this ability (i.e. Nick Fury, Gorgon) - citing they lack fear as the reason.

The current version of Phobos (Alex) was at one time a highly trained swordsman and possessed strength and endurance similar to other Olympian gods in the Marvel universe, however this has since been ret-conned. Secret Warriors #10 re-establishes his training with a sword. He was denied use of it by his father Ares, who required him to be proficient in all forms of arms before returning his sword.

Currently he, like the previous Phobos, can instill fear in others. Additionally, he has shown evidence of pre-cognitive powers.

When utilizing his fear based powers, Alex's eyes glow. The color has shown to vary between white and red. Whether this is simply due to the artist's rendering or the level of power usage is unknown.

Relationship between the two characters
 
Currently, it is unclear whether the original Phobos and the current Alex are actually two separate characters. Examining their respective first appearances it would appear that they are, as both have distinct personalities and ability sets. In fact, their father Ares even explicitly states that both are separate individuals within the 2006 Ares: God of War mini-series.

However, this mini-series takes place before Brian Michael Bendis retconned the origin and abilities of Alex. Within the mini-series Alex had grown well into his late teens, had acquired a mastery of almost all forms of weaponry, and was well aware of his divine heritage. However, when Alex next appears in Mighty Avengers #13 he is barely 10, has no combat experience, and is aware that his father is the god Ares. It is also in Mighty Avengers #13 that Alex is first identified as Ares' son Phobos, and displays abilities similar to the original version of the character. Thus, it would appear that Bendis retconned the events of the mini-series and that Alex and Phobos are potentially the same character.

Adding to the confusion, based on the events in The Incredible Hercules #117 it seems that parts of the Ares: God of War mini-series are, in fact, still considered canon. Namely, Mikaboshi's plot and attempt to destroy the divine pantheons in the Marvel Universe. Since Alex's capture and development were central to Mikaboshi's plan, yet also directly contradict his later appearances in Mighty Avengers and Secret Warriors, the current status of both characters remains unclear.

According to the Thor & Hercules: Encyclopaedia Mythologica, the original Phobos and the current Alex are two separate characters.  More specifically, they are half-brothers.  The Phobos profile indicates that the original Phobos (and his brother Deimos) were killed during Mikaboshi's invasion of Olympus, and that Alexander inherited the fear-based powers of his slain older half-brother following his return to Earth.

Dark Reign: New Nation #1 states the Ares: God of War limited series as the first appearance of Alex. However, this does not indicate if he is meant to be related to the previous Phobos, such as in a re-imagining or reincarnation.

Reception
 In 2019, CBR.com ranked Phobos 9th in their "Marvel Comics: The 10 Most Powerful Olympians" list.
 In 2022, Sportskeeda ranked Phobos 9th in their "10 best Greek gods from Marvel comics " list.

Notes

References

Phobos at the Appendix to the Handbook of the Marvel Universe

External links
Phobos at the Marvel Universe

Comics characters introduced in 1991
Classical mythology in Marvel Comics
Greek and Roman deities in fiction
Fictional characters with precognition
Fictional gods
Fictional swordfighters in comics
Marvel Comics deities
Marvel Comics characters who have mental powers
Marvel Comics characters with superhuman strength